CIRA (Centre International de Recherches sur l'Anarchisme) is an anarchist archive, infoshop and library of anarchist material in different languages based in Lausanne, Switzerland with other branches in Marseille and Fujinomiya, Japan.

History

CIRA was founded in 1957 in Geneva and moved to Lausanne in 1965. It had several locations before its present building. It was run initially by a collective including historian René Bianco, Pietro Ferrua and Marie-Christine Mikhaïlo. Mikhaïlo ended up running the library with her daughter Marianne Enckell. CIRA differed from other anarchist archives in that it was an association recognised by the city council and it employed a worker, as well as taking people doing civil service instead of army conscription. There are also branches of CIRA in Marseille and in Japan. CIRA Nippon was set up in 1970 in Fujinomiya, a city which is halfway between Tokyo and Osaka, and as of 2011, the archive contained 2000 books.

In 1978, CIRA set up the Fédération Internationale des Centes d'Études et de Documentation Libertaires (FICEDL) which aimed to be a group bringing together different anarchist archives worldwide. CIRA celebrated its fiftieth birthday in 2007 with a gathering in Lausanne. Similar historical archives include  International Institute of Social History (IISG, Amsterdam), the Arbejder-bevaegelsens Bibliotek og Arkiv (ABA, Copenhagen), the Schweizerisches Sozialarchiv (Zürich), the Bibliothèque de Documentation Internationale Contemporaine (BDIC, Nanterre) and the Historische Kommission in Berlin. As of 2020, the library in Lausanne holds 20,000 books and pamphlets and 4,000 periodicals (100 of which are still active).

Publications
CIRA has published a yearly bulletin since 1959, which is available to subscribers and also online. The bulletin contains a list of acquisitions and information about research, libraries and conferences. The edited collection Refuser de parvenir was published by the CIRA collective in 2016 following discussions held at CIRA in 2013 and 2014.

See also
Anarchy Archives
Kate Sharpley Library

References

External links
 

DIY culture
Infoshops
International anarchist organizations
Buildings and structures in Lausanne
1957 establishments in Switzerland
Libraries in Switzerland
Anarchism in Switzerland